Taratgaon is a village in the Karmala taluka of Solapur district in Maharashtra state, India.

Demographics
Covering  and comprising 132 households at the time of the 2011 census of India, Taratgaon had a population of 601. There were 306 males and 295 females, with 53 people being aged six or younger.

References

Villages in Karmala taluka